Chelignathus is an extinct genus of pseudoscorpion in the family Tridenchthoniidae. There is one described species in Chelignathus, C. kochii.

References

Tridenchthoniidae
Articles created by Qbugbot
Pseudoscorpion genera